Finningley is a civil parish in the metropolitan borough of Doncaster, South Yorkshire, England.  The parish contains four listed buildings that are recorded in the National Heritage List for England.  Of these, one is listed at Grade I, the highest of the three grades, and the others are at Grade II, the lowest grade.  The parish contains the village of Finningley and the surrounding area.  All the listed buildings are in the village, and consist of a church, the former rectory, the village hall, and a house.


Key

Buildings

References

Citations

Sources

Lists of listed buildings in South Yorkshire
Buildings and structures in the Metropolitan Borough of Doncaster